Alasea is a genus of moths in the family Choreutidae, containing only one species, Alasea corniculata, which is known from Costa Rica.

The length of the forewings is 4.5–5.2 mm for males and 5.2–5.7 mm for females.

Etymology
The species is named for the horn-shaped projection on the valva. The word is derived from the Latin adjective corniculatus.

References

External links
Choreutidae.lifedesks.org:  Holotype picture

Choreutidae
Monotypic moth genera
Moths of Central America